Love Is Dead is the debut studio album by Estonian recording artist Kerli. It was released in the United States on 8 July 2008 by Island Records.

Love Is Dead is a pop, rock and electronica record that incorporates gothic influences. Its sound has been noted to contain influences from the music of artists such as Natasha Bedingfield and Björk, while it has been described as both uplifting and dark.
The album received critical acclaim, with reviewers lauding its uniqueness and composition, while praising Kerli's vocals. The album peaked at number 2 on the US Heatseekers Albums chart, which measures the popularity of albums by new artists. It also reached number 126 on the Billboard 200 in the United States.

Background and writing 
Kerli began writing for her debut album at the age of 14 but after two failed recording contracts with Universal Republic Records and Stolen Transmission, she spent two years in Sweden writing music with other writers at the request of a Swedish publisher who took an interest in her music. She later caught the attention of Island Records and landed an audition with L.A. Reid who signed her. During the audition, which was Kerli's first visit to the United States, she later remarked she was "so out of it" which came off as rude, saying "I guess he liked that I wasn't kissing his ass".

In a 2008 interview, Kerli said she was grateful she was not in a position to release an album after gaining her first contract because, saying "I wasn't ready as a person. I didn't stand behind my vision the way I do now, and everything was much more about my ego and need for attention. It's about people now. It's about delivering something magical." She described the process of creating the album as a "10-year struggle".

Composition 
Kerli cites her upbringing in an abusive household as one of the main influences on Love Is Dead, saying "This is the place that I created for myself to escape to, and I want to share it with people now".

Lyrical content 
The lyrics of the songs on Love Is Dead focus around Kerli's depression at the time as well as her life in Estonia. She noted a feeling of oppression and hostility still present in Estonia after the Soviet occupation ended, saying "I felt like everybody was always trying to break my spirit. I felt very lonely because I was always very passionate and very over the top. I was not scared to be different. I had to create my own world. I had to work hard and dream hard to get out of that environment." While citing "Walking on Air" and "Love Is Dead" as her favorite tracks from the album, she cites "Butterfly Cry" as the most meaningful song for her as it was the first song she wrote after coming out of her depression. It was written when she was 17 with Krister Linder, who she says was her "spiritual mentor".

"Walking on Air" and "Creepshow" discuss Kerli's childhood. Kerli has noted autobiographical connections to specific lyrics from "Walking on Air" such as "She has a little creepy cat" and "little rocking chair and an old blue hat" by recalling a feral cat she rescued as well as frequently wearing old hats as a child. "Creepshow" concerns Estonia specifically where Kerli says "being different is not really accepted" and that "it felt like even more of a creepshow than this little town environment that I wanted to get out of."

Release and promotion 
Originally due to be released in April 2008, the album was pushed back to July 29 and then pushed up to July 8. It eventually gained a wider European release in 2009 with a release in Italy in February, in Germany in April, and in Austria and Ireland in summer 2009. "Bulletproof" was part of Punisher: War Zone Original Motion Picture Soundtrack too.

Singles 
"Love Is Dead" is the First Promotional Single Released November 21, 2007 with "Walking on Air" being released on 8 April 2008 as the lead single and was a moderate success. "Creepshow" was a promo single in late 2008, "The Creationist" was released as the album's second and final commercial single exclusively in Italy in December 2009. This version also had new vocals from singer Cesare Cremonini.

Critical reception 

Love Is Dead received positive reviews from music critics. Rick Florino of Artistdirect raved that the album is "more than just 'alternative music;' it's alternative art. Kerli's vision extends far beyond the notes recorded on her CD, and that's instantly apparent from her twisted fairytale aesthetic." Heather Phares of AllMusic concluded that "despite its faults, it is one of the most unique albums released by a major label in 2008." About.com's Ben Norman agreed, stating that it is "one of the best and most unique major label offerings of 2008, and hardly something to miss. With Kerli's emergence into the dance scene, I predict that this is the album to watch." Slant Magazine reviewer Sal Cinquemani complimented the album's first three tracks, "Love Is Dead", "Walking on Air", and "The Creationist", commenting that "they display enough diversity and musical savvy, if not actual talent, to warrant an endorsement", but criticized songs like "Creepshow" ("over-the-top") and "Butterfly Cry" ("plodding"). He also added that "[t]he formulas employed throughout Love Is Dead are often trite but the undeniable excitement and awe with which she approaches them is just as frequently refreshing."

Christy Grosz from the Los Angeles Times wrote that "[a]lthough her songs occasionally feature the alto piano of Apple or the otherworldly trilling of Morissette or Björk, her voice can sound thin and inconsistent, giving the whole thing a somewhat derivative feel" and that "a little more creepiness would give Kerli the edge that her appearance advertises." In his review for Blender, Andrew Harrison noted that "Love Is Deads gothic gray walls of riff and throbbing drum machines are convincing enough, and Kerli has clearly lived a tough old life so far. Unfortunately, it translates into kohl-eyed pantomime, rather than cathartic music, with lyrics so hopelessly trite they sound like a feel-good tract for preschoolers." Vail Dailys Charlie Owen felt that the album "reveals Kerli's talent but sounds more like she's trying to find a direction than blazing a trail."

Commercial performance
The album debuted at number 126 on the Billboard 200 in the United States, selling 5,500 copies in its first week. It also entered at number three on the Top Heatseekers chart (peaking at number two, two weeks later) and peaked at number 141 on the Top Digital Albums chart. With this, Kerli is the first Estonian artist to chart on the Billboard 200, where the album spent four weeks before dropping off. Despite having four single releases, the only song that made any impact on the charts was "Walking on Air".

Track listing 

Note
"Love Is Dead" contains samples of "Love Don't Live Here Anymore" by Rose Royce (written by Miles Gregory).

Personnel 
Credits adapted from Love Is Dead liner notes.

Production

 Guy Chambers – producer
 John Deley – string arranger
 T.J. Doherty – engineer
 Jason Epperson – producer
 John Ewing, Jr. – engineer
 Ill Factor – drum programmer
 Richard Flack – additional programmer, mixer
 Matty Green – assistant mixer
 Mike Green – engineer, mixer, assistant mixer
 Keith Gretlein – assistant engineer
 Benji Madden – producer
 Joel Madden – producer
 Lasse Mårtén – engineering, recording
 Mathias Mårtén – engineering, recording
 Tony Maserati – mixer
 David Maurice – drum programmer, engineer, mixer, producer
 Lester Mendez – producer, arranger
 Christian Olsson – programmer
 Neal Pogue – mixer
 Mark Roule – Pro Tools engineer, assistant mixer
 Natalie Shau – label art
 Paul Stanborough – acoustic guitar, programmer, recorder
 Oliver Strauss – string engineer
 Charles Wilson, Jr. – assistant mix engineer
 Mathias Wollo – arranger, producer, recorder
 Joe Wohlmuth – engineer

Musicians

 Peter Ågren – composer
 Mio Alt – violins
 Gregg E. August – double bass
 Vanessa Bley – backing vocals, composer
 Karl Brazil – drums, percussion
 Inbal Brener – cello
 Guy Chambers – ace tone rhythm ace, acoustic guitar, backing vocals, bass guitar, composer, fuzz guitar, synths, upright piano
 John Deley – keyboards
 Fil Eisler – guitars, bass guitar
 Per Eklund – drums, percussion
 Tony Falanga – double bass
 Fleshquartet – strings
 Richard Fortus – guitar
 Josh Freese – drums
 Tanesha Gary – backing vocals
 Josh Garza – drums
 Mike Green – bass
 Miles Gregory – composer ("Love Don't Live Here Anymore" sample)
 Mattias Hellden – cello
 Örjan Högberg – viola
 Jennifer Karr – backing vocals
 Kerli Kõiv – vocals, composer
 Yoon Kwon – violins
 Anders Lennartsson – composer
 Andreas Lavander – bass, organ
 Krister Linder – composer
 Jonas Lindgren – violin
 Benji Madden – composer, guitars
 Joel Madden – composer
 Audrey Martells – backing vocals
 David Maurice – bass guitar, composer, guitars, keyboards
 Lester Mendez – composer
 Emily Ondrovek – violins
 Joel W. Noyes – cello
 Sebastian Oberg – cello
 Inbal Segev – cello
 Sonus Quartet – strings
 Philip Spetzer – violins
 Jonathan Vinocour – viola
 Skoota Warner – drums
 Thomas Who – composer
 Mathias Wollo – guitars, kalimba, organ
 Alison Zlotow – violins

Charts

Release history

References

2008 debut albums
Island Records albums
Kerli albums
Electronic albums by Estonian artists
European Border Breakers Award-winning albums